Boix is a Catalan surname, literally meaning "box", often referring to the plant genus Buxus.

People with the name
 Carles Boix (born 1962), Spanish political scientist
 Emili Boix-Fuster (born 1956), Spanish sociolinguist
 Francisco Boix (1920–1951), Spanish photographer
 Leo Boix, Argentine-British poet, translator, journalist
 Montserrat Boix (born 1960), Spanish journalist
 Vicente Boix (1813–1880), Spanish playwright, poet, and historian

References

Catalan-language surnames